The Hundred of Karcultaby is a cadastral unit of hundred located on the northern Eyre Peninsula of South Australia spanning the townships of Poochera, Karcultaby and surrounds. One of the 24 hundreds of the County of Robinson, it was proclaimed in 1913 by Governor Day Bosanquet and named for Karcultaby Homestead, in the extreme southeast of the hundred.

Located within a vast low-rainfall wheat belt, the hundred has been locally governed since 1888 by the District Council of Streaky Bay, which was established in that year.

See also
 Lands administrative divisions of South Australia

References

Karcultaby
1913 establishments in Australia